ASPIDA-ROM (ΑΣΠΙΔΑ-ΡΟΜ, ΑΣΠΙΔΑ being an acronym for  "Independent Rally of Citizens with Special Self-Identification". The Greek word aspida means "shield") is a Greek political party established on January 15, 2006 to campaign for the rights of the Roma in Greece.

ASPIDA claims that there are around 600,000 Roma in Greece. Its president and candidates for local and mayoral elections, which are due in October 2006, will be elected at a forthcoming party conference. The party spokesperson is Christos Lambrou. The party enjoys the support of the Panhellenic Confederation of Greek Roma (PACONGR).

Political parties established in 2006
Romani in Greece
Romani political parties
Political parties of minorities in Greece
2006 establishments in Greece